Stuart Paul Gyngell (born 25 November 1963) is an Australian former athlete who specialised in shot put.

Gyngell, a Sydney-based thrower, set a national shot put record in 1985 of 18.89m. He was Australia's national title holder in the shot put in both 1985 and 1986. At the 1986 Commonwealth Games in Edinburgh, he claimed a bronze medal in the shot put, finishing behind Billy Cole and Joe Quigley. Soon after he gave up competitive athletics, partly motivated by an ambition to become a Christian minister. He is also qualified as a veterinary surgeon.

References

External links
Stuart Gyngell at World Athletics

1963 births
Living people
Australian male shot putters
Athletes from Sydney
Commonwealth Games bronze medallists for Australia
Commonwealth Games medallists in athletics
Athletes (track and field) at the 1986 Commonwealth Games
Medallists at the 1986 Commonwealth Games